Father Music, Mother Dance is an album by American violinist and composer Michael White featuring performances recorded in 1974 and released on the Impulse! label.

Track listing
All compositions by Michael White
 "Father Music, Mother Dance" - 5:40   
 "Reiko" - 6:31   
 "Commin' From" - 4:49   
 "Way Down Inside" - 6:34   
 "Water Children" - 9:15   
 "Mary's Waltz" - 3:38

Personnel
Michael White - electric violin, rhythm violin, African tambourine, bass drum, handclapper, Moog synthesizer, vocals
Norman Williams - alto saxophone
Clifford Coulter - piano, electric piano, organ
Bob King - guitar
Kenneth Jenkins - bass, electric bass
Clarence Becton - drums, agogô
Kenneth Nash - congas, North African sakara drum, Knole drum, Chinese temple bells and gongs, cowbell, tambourine, wood bells, piano, electric piano bottom, pepper filled Kodak film can shaker, assorted African and South American percussion instruments
Marti McCall - lead vocals, backing vocals
Josef Powell, Myrna Matthews - backing vocals

References

Impulse! Records albums
Michael White (violinist) albums
1974 albums
Albums recorded at Wally Heider Studios